Athol, Ontario can mean the following places:
Athol Bay, Prince Edward County, Ontario
Athol, an unincorporated place north of Maxville, Ontario